WQMJ (100.1 FM) is a radio station broadcasting an urban oldies format. Licensed to Forsyth, Georgia, United States, the station serves the Macon area.  The station is currently owned by Roberts Communications, Inc.

History
The station went on the air as WIBB-FM on May 22, 1987. On September 8, 1987, the station changed its call sign to WFXM-FM. On March 20, 2000, it was changed to the current WQMJ.

References

External links
Majic-100-Radio Facebook

Radio stations established in 1987
1987 establishments in Georgia (U.S. state)
Urban oldies radio stations in the United States
QMJ